Truck Stop Women is a 1974 film, directed by Mark L. Lester and partly financed by Phil Gramm.

Plot 
A mother (Lieux Dressler) runs a brothel for truckers on the New Mexico highways and her stable includes her daughter (Claudia Jennings). The daughter is sick of her mother controlling things and begins working with some men from the "Eastern Mafia" who are attempting to take over their operation.

Cast 
 Claudia Jennings as Rose
 Lieux Dressler as Anna
 Dennis Fimple as Curly
 Gene Drew as Mac
 Paul Carr as Seago
 Jennifer Burton as Tina
 Johnny Martino as Smith

References

External links 
 

1974 films
Trucker films
American sexploitation films
Films directed by Mark L. Lester
1970s exploitation films
American action drama films
1970s action drama films
Films about prostitution in the United States
Films set in New Mexico
1974 drama films
1970s English-language films
1970s American films